Part Four (Part IV) of the Constitution of Albania is the fourth of eighteen parts.
Titled The President of the Republic, it consists of 9 articles.

The President of the Republic

References

4